Spencer is a census-designated place (CDP) in the town of Spencer in Worcester County, Massachusetts, United States. The population was 5,700 at the 2010 census.

Geography
Spencer is located at  (42.243276, -71.99437).

Demographics

At the 2000 census, there were 6,032 people, 2,554 households and 1,527 families residing in the CDP. The racial make-up was 97.58% White, 0.61% Black or African American, 0.31% Native American, 0.28% Asian, 0.02% Pacific Islander, 0.41% from other races and 0.78% from two or more races. Hispanic or Latino of any race were 1.61% of the population.

There were 2,554 households, of which 29.8% had children under the age of 18 living with them, 42.8% were married couples living together, 12.5% had a female householder with no husband present and 40.2% were non-families. 33.0% of all households were made up of individuals, and 13.5% had someone living alone who was 65 years of age or older. The average household size was 2.35 and the average family size was 2.98.

24.4% of the population were under the age of 18, 9.9% from 18 to 24, 30.7% from 25 to 44, 20.9% from 45 to 64 and 14.1% were 65 years of age or older. The median age was 35 years. For every 100 females, there were 91.8 males. For every 100 females age 18 and over, there were 89.3 males.

The median household income was $35,206 and the median family income was $46,333. Males had a median income of $36,563 and females $25,738. The per capita income was $18,975. About 9.0% of families and 12.0% of the population were below the poverty line, including 16.6% of those under age 18 and 11.7% of those age 65 or over.

References

Census-designated places in Worcester County, Massachusetts
Census-designated places in Massachusetts